Pat DeCola (born June 30, 1987, in Lawrence, Massachusetts) is an American sports reporter for NASCAR.Biography
DeCola attended Saint Joseph's College of Maine in Standish, Maine, and graduated with a B.A. in Communications in 2009. He is currently Manager, Digital Editorial for NASCAR.com. He was previously a writer for Fox Sports.

DeCola joined Fox Sports in 2009 and wrote for FOXSports.com and its regional sites until March 2012 before agreeing to join Sportradar US later that month.

He worked at the New Hampshire Union Leader as a sports reporter beginning in 2010, but left in January 2013 to aid in the re-launch of NASCAR.com under NASCAR Digital Media.

In August 2012, DeCola joined Bleacher Report as a Featured Columnist.

From April 2012 to July 2012, DeCola worked with blogger, political commentator, and author Michelle Malkin as a contributing editor on her Twitter curation site, Twitchy.com before resigning over a difference in ideology.

DeCola also played guitar in the now-defunct indie rock band The Cantstanjas.

References

 Molori, John (October 2010). DeCola making mark in sports media, MethuenLife'', p. 24.

External links
 Fox Sports MLB Power Rankings
 Fox Sports Southwest
 Sports Data MLB Power Rankings
 Getting to Know The Cantstanjas/Boston Music Spotlight
 The Cantstanjas Bandcamp
 Pat DeCola journalism portfolio
 

Living people
1987 births
Saint Joseph's College of Maine alumni
People from Lawrence, Massachusetts
Writers from Massachusetts
Sportswriters from Massachusetts